Cliff Osmond (born Clifford Osman Ebrahim; February 26, 1937 – December 22, 2012) was an American character actor and television screenwriter. A parallel career as an acting teacher coincided with his other activities.

Early life
 
Osmond was born in the Margaret Hague Medical Center in Jersey City, New Jersey, and reared in Union City, New Jersey. He was a graduate of Thomas A. Edison grammar school, Emerson High School, and Dartmouth College (Bachelor of Arts in English). He received his master's degree in Business Administration from the University of California, Los Angeles and advanced to candidacy for the Ph.D. in the field of Theater History at UCLA.

Career
He starred in four films directed by Billy Wilder, including Irma la Douce, Kiss Me, Stupid (1964), The Fortune Cookie and The Front Page. Osmond played Pap in the 1981 television adaptation for The Adventures of Huckleberry Finn.

Osmond appeared in over one hundred films and television series. During that period he guest-starred at least half a dozen times on Gunsmoke and in the 1965 episode "Yahoo" of NBC's Laredo. He played a vengeful blind man in the “None So Blind” episode of The Rifleman in 1962, and was cast in "The Gift", (1962) of the original The Twilight Zone. He played a hippie in Ironside (1968) and appeared as well on Here's Lucy (1974), The New Land (1974), as a plumber's apprentice on work release from prison in All in the Family (1975).
 
As a screenwriter, Osmond was nominated for a Writer's Guild Award for writing an episode of Streets of San Francisco (1973). He also wrote and directed the film The Penitent. 
 
Osmond received a Best Actor award for his UCLA performance of Berthold Brecht's Baal, and the Joseph Jefferson acting award for a Chicago stage appearance in Shaw's You Never Can Tell. 

In addition to his acting and writing careers, Osmond was an acting teacher and coach in Los Angeles and San Francisco. In the fall of 2004, he was visiting professor in acting and Guest Resident Artist at Georgetown University, teaching two acting courses and directing Henrik Ibsen's A Doll's House. 
 
In 2010, he wrote a book about his career and acting: Acting Is Living: Exploring the Ten Essential Elements in any Successful Performance.

Death
Osmond died of pancreatic cancer on December 22, 2012.

Filmography

The Rifleman (1962) - None So Blind 
'The Rifleman (1962) - Bartender (uncredited)Wagon Train (1962) "The John Bernard Story" - Ben GillIrma La Douce (1963) - Police SergeantHave Gun, Will Travel (February 22, 1963) - "Caravan" - Koro
The Raiders (1963) - Private Jean Duchamps
Wild and Wonderful (1964) - Hercule - Giselle's Uncle
Kiss Me, Stupid (1964) - Barney
Laredo (1965, TV) - Midas Mantee / Running Antelope
The Fortune Cookie (1966) - Purkey
Batman   (1967,TV) - Andante
Three Guns for Texas (1968) - Running Antelope
The Devil's 8 (1969) - Bubba
Sweet Sugar (1972) - Burgos
Invasion of the Bee Girls (1973) - Captain Peters
Oklahoma Crude (1973) - Massive Man
The Front Page (1974) - Jacobi
Sharks' Treasure (1975) - Lobo
Emergency! (1975) - S4Ep5 - Clide
Bob Newhart Show (1975) - S5Ep3 - Leonard de Paolo
Joe Panther (1976) - Rance
Guardian of the Wilderness (1976) - McCollough
The Mouse and His Child (1977) - C. Serpentina (voice)
The Great Brain (1978) - Mr. Kokovinis
The North Avenue Irregulars (1979) - Big Chin
The Apple Dumpling Gang Rides Again (1979) - Wes Hardin (Bank-robber)
Beggarman, Thief (1979, TV) - Sagerac
Hangar 18 (1980) - Sheriff Barlow
The Adventures of Nellie Bly (1981, TV) - Stanfil
Lone Star Sports Bar & Grill (1983) - Cal
In Search of a Golden Sky (1984) - Russ McGuire
For Which He Stands (1996) - Javier Chavez (final film role)

References

External links

 
 

1937 births
2012 deaths
American male film actors
American male television actors
Deaths from cancer in California
Deaths from pancreatic cancer
Male actors from Jersey City, New Jersey
People from Union City, New Jersey
Male actors from Los Angeles
Dartmouth College alumni
University of California, Los Angeles alumni
Georgetown University faculty
American memoirists
Western (genre) television actors